Tetraspanin-6 is a protein that in humans is encoded by the TSPAN6 gene.

The protein encoded by this gene is a member of the transmembrane 4 superfamily, also known as the tetraspanin family. Most of these members are cell-surface proteins characterized by the presence of four hydrophobic domains. The proteins mediate signal transduction events that play a role in the regulation of cell development, activation, growth and motility. This encoded protein is a cell surface glycoprotein and is highly similar in sequence to the transmembrane 4 superfamily member 2. The use of alternate polyadenylation sites has been found for this gene.

References

Further reading